Donald Campbell (died 4 July 1763) was a British officer in the Royal American Regiment killed during the siege of Fort Detroit in Pontiac's War. He was taken prisoner during a flag of truce, and later killed and dismembered by Ojibwa chief Wasson, who ate his heart. His remains were thrown into the river and were then picked up and buried at Fort Detroit.

References
 

Year of birth missing
1763 deaths
British people of Pontiac's War
British military personnel killed in action
Cannibalised people
Royal American Regiment officers
Scottish soldiers